Joseph Henry McDermott (July 28, 1871 – December 12, 1930) was the Republican President of the West Virginia Senate from Monongalia County and served from 1907 to 1909.

References

West Virginia state senators
Presidents of the West Virginia State Senate
1871 births
1930 deaths